Leo Wattimena Airport, formerly known as Pitu Airport  is a private airport located on the southern coast of Morotai Island, North Maluku, Indonesia.

History

World War II

Morotai island was the final island invasion in Netherlands New Guinea before the liberation of the Philippines.  The island was recaptured by the 31st Infantry Division on 15 September 1944, meeting only light opposition. General MacArthur and Rear Admiral Barbey landed on the day of the invasion to make an inspection. At the time, the island had only five hundred Japanese defenders.

After the landings, Navy Seabees constructed two airfields on the island, Wama and Pitu.  Wama was constructed almost along the shoreline and was used as a fighter airfield.  It was abandoned after the war. Pitu was built as a bomber airfield to the north inland, and is currently used as a commercial airport.

After the war, the island was one of the largest Fifth Air Force aircraft reclamation center in the Pacific. A smelting operation was established, and USAAF planes from all over the region were flown there to be scrapped. Despite scrapping the island was crammed full of aircraft and vehicles until 1988 when it was cleared in a final scrap drive. The scrap was taken to Krakatau Steel Mill in Java.

Allied units stationed on Morotai
 38th Bombardment Group (15 October 1944 – 29 January 1945)
 310th Bombardment Wing  (18 September-14 November 1944)
 8th Fighter Group (19 September – 20 December 1944)
 35th Fighter Group (27 September 1944 – 20 January 1945)
 418th Night Fighter Squadron (28 September – 26 December 1944)

West New Guinea dispute
During the buildup in preparation of Operation Trikora in early 1962, the Indonesian Air Force utilized Morotai airfield as one of the frontline airbases. In late June 1962, the air force deployed four to six Tu-16 strategic bombers, six to ten Il-28 medium bombers, two UF-1 Albatross search-and-rescue seaplanes and two Mi-4 helicopters at Morotai. Later the Il-28s were moved to Laha and Amahai due to insufficient range to the Western New Guinea. The Indonesian Navy naval aviation also deployed eight Gannet anti-submarine aircraft. For the airbase defenses, the air force stationed six MiG-17 as interceptor and air defense, a Polish-built Nyasa radar unit as early warning system, an anti-aircraft unit equipped with Hispano-Suiza HS.804 cannons, and a company of base defense troops. The Indonesian Army also stationed an air-defense artillery unit from Pattimura Battalion.

Airlines and destinations

See also

 USAAF in the Southwest Pacific

References

 Djati, Pungky Purnomo; et al. (1996). Perjuangan AURI dalam Trikora (Indonesian Air Force's Struggle during Trikora). Jakarta: Indonesian Air Force Headquarters. (in Indonesian)
 Maurer, Maurer (1983). Air Force Combat Units Of World War II. Maxwell AFB, Alabama: Office of Air Force History. .

External links
 Pitu Airfield at Pacificwrecks.com

Airports in North Maluku
Airfields of the United States Army Air Forces in the South West Pacific theatre of World War II
Airfields of the United States Army Air Forces Air Transport Command in the South West Pacific Theater
World War II sites in Indonesia
Indonesian Air Force bases